Edgar Huckvale Maddox (1 May 1878 – 1 September 1923) was an Australian rules footballer who played with St Kilda in the Victorian Football League (VFL).

Family
The son of William Fowler Maddox (1848-1912), and Elizabeth Annie Maddox (1849-1927), née Barnett, Edgar Huckvale Maddox was born in Melbourne on 1 May 1878.

Death
He died at Waterfall, New South Wales on 1 September 1923.

Footnotes

External links 

1878 births
1923 deaths
Australian rules footballers from Melbourne
St Kilda Football Club players
Port Melbourne Football Club players